Aviatrans Kiev was an airline based in Kyiv, Ukraine. The airline operates charter services for tour operators between Ukraine and destinations in Europe.
Aviatrans Kyiv is the successor of the former Trans Kyiv which loses the flying license.

Fleet
The Aviatrans Kiev fleet included the following aircraft:

2 McDonnell Douglas MD-83 operated by Khors Air
1 Airbus A320-200 the aircraft operated jointly with Wind Rose Aviation

References

External links

2009 establishments in Ukraine
Airlines established in 2009
Defunct airlines of Ukraine